Events in the year 1988 in Turkey.

Parliament
18th Parliament of Turkey

Incumbents
President – Kenan Evren 
Prime Minister – Turgut Özal 
Leader of the opposition – Erdal İnönü

Ruling party and the main opposition
 Ruling party – Motherland Party (ANAP) 
 Main opposition – Social Democratic Populist Party (SHP)

Cabinet
46th government of Turkey

Events

January 
 11 January – Turkey signs Council of Europe’s convention on “Prevention of Torture and Inhuman or Degrading Treatment or Punishment.”
 25 January – Turkey signs United Nations’ international convention against inhuman treatment and torture.

February 
 1 February – Socialist Party founded.
 28 February – First heart transplant in Turkey (Ankara University)

April 
 6 April – State visit of British prime minister Margaret Thatcher.
 27 April – Naim Süleymanoğlu wins three gold medals in Cardiff European Weightlifting Championships.

May 
 29 May – Galatasaray wins the championship

June 
 26 June – State visit of Kenan Evren to the United States.

July 
 3 July – Second bridge over the Bosporus opens.
 12 July – State visit of Evren to Great Britain.

September 
 20 September –  Naim Süleymanoğlu wins gold in the 1988 Summer Olympics in Seoul.

October 
 16 October – State visit of Evren to West Germany.

November 
 20 November – Suat Atalık gains the title Grandmaster in Chess Olympiad.

December 
 3 December – Council of Higher Education, the highest body of Turkish universities, lifts ban against Islamic-style head scarves for female university students.
 8 December – Constitutional Court rejects request by chief prosecutor to close down Socialist Party.
 16 December – State visit of Turgut Özal to the United States.

Births
5 January – Ziya Erdal, footballer
8 January – Burcu Erbaş, basketball player
2 February – Turgut Doğan Şahin, footballer
10 April – Özgürcan Özcan, footballer
1 May – Tuğçe Şahutoğlu, hammer thrower
11 May – Tuğçe Hocaoğlu, volleyball player
31 May – Didem Ege, volleyball player
8 June – Begüm Dalgalar – basketball player 
13 July – Neriman Özsoy, volleyball player
7 September – Yağmur Koçyiğit, volleyball player
26 September – Servet Tazegül, taekwondo practitioner 
28 September – Bahar Çağlar, basketball player
15 October – Mesut Özil, footballer

Deaths
8 January – Duygu Aykal (born in 1943), ballerina
24 March – Turhan Feyzioğlu (born in 1922), lawyer, politician
18 April – Oktay Rifat (born in 1914), novelist
1 May – Altan Erbulak (born in 1929), caricaturist, theatre actor
31 May – Lütfi Akadlı (born in 1902), lawyer
3 September – Ferit Melen (born in 1906), former prime minister (35th government of Turkey)
29 September – Sıtkı Yırcalı (born 1908), politician

Gallery

See also
Turkey in the Eurovision Song Contest 1988
 1987–88 1.Lig
Turkey at the 1988 Summer Olympics
Turkey at the 1988 Winter Olympics

References

 
Years of the 20th century in Turkey
Turkey
Turkey
Turkey